The 1949 Southwestern Louisiana Bulldogs football team was an American football team that represented the Southwestern Louisiana Institute of Liberal and Technical Learning (now known as the University of Louisiana at Lafayette) in the Gulf States Conference during the 1949 college football season. In their third year under head coach Gee Mitchell, the team compiled a 6–3 record.

Schedule

References

Southwestern Louisiana
Louisiana Ragin' Cajuns football seasons
Southwestern Louisiana Bulldogs football